The Changing Man may refer to:

"The Changingman", a song by Paul Weller from the Stanley Road album
Shade, the Changing Man, a fictional comic book character
Changing Man, a 2011 album by Jaap Reesema